This article provides a non-exhaustive list of famous people born, educated or prominent in Bath, Somerset, England, or otherwise associated with it. The sections and the names in each section are alphabetical. Bathonian describes a person who comes from Bath.

Acting

Jennifer Biddall (born 1980) an English actress who played Jessica Harris in Hollyoaks 
Patricia Brake (1942–2022) – actress in Porridge, and Going Straight
Adam Campbell (born 1980) – actor in Epic Movie and Date Movie
Julia Davis (born 1966) an English actress, comedian, director and writer.
Michael Gwynn (1916–1976) an English actor
Anthony Head (born 1954) an English actor, singer and performer in musical theatre.
Jonathan Hyde (born 1948) an Australian-English actor.
Kym Jackson (born 1981) an Australian actress and author. 
Andrew Lincoln (born 1973)  an English actor, brought up in Bath.
Jonathan Lynn (born 1943) – actor, writer and director
Angelica Mandy (living) – in Vanity Fair, and in the Harry Potter series as Gabrielle Delacour
Leo McKern (1920–2002) – Rumpole actor
Tom Payne (born 1982) an English actor.
Arnold Ridley (1896–1984) an English playwright and actor.
Sarah Siddons (1755–1831) – actress
Benjamin Nottingham Webster (1797–1882) an English actor-manager and dramatist.
Indira Varma (born 1973) a British actress.

Architecture

Robert Adam (1728–1792) – architect of Pulteney Bridge, also produced unbuilt designs for the Assembly Rooms and Bathwick estate.
Thomas Baldwin (c. 1750–1820) – architect of Great Pulteney Street and Bath Guildhall.
Sir Reginald Blomfield (1856–1942) – architect of the Bath War Memorial and extension of the Holbourne Museum.
Thomas Fuller (1823–1898) – emigrated to Canada, where he co-designed the Parliament House in Ottawa.
Frederick Gibberd (1908–1984) – architect of Bath Technical College.
Henry Goodridge (1797–1864) – architect of Beckford's Tower, Cleveland Bridge and The Corridor shopping arcade
Sir Thomas Graham Jackson (1835–1924) – architect of the World War I memorial aisle Bath Abbey.
Charles Harcourt Masters (born 1759) – active in Bathwick including Sydney Gardens.
William Eden Nesfield (1835–1888) – architect, one of the leaders of the Gothic revival in England.
John Palmer (c. 1738–1817) – architect of the Pump Room and Lansdown Crescent.
Charles J. Phipps (1835–1897) – Theatre Royal, Bath and other theatres around Britain.
John Pinch the Elder (1769–1827) – the original Royal United Hospital
John Pinch the Younger (1796–1849) – architect
George Gilbert Scott (1811–1878) – restoration of Bath Abbey, architect of St Andrew's church destroyed by World War II bombing
Frederick William Stevens (1847–1900) – architect, emigrated to India.
John Wood, the Elder (1704–1754) – architect of Queen Square and the Circus.
John Wood, the Younger (1728–1772) – architect of the Royal Crescent.

Arts
Roy Ascott (born 1934) – new media artist
Daniel A. Baker (living) – artist
Manolo Blahnik (born 1942) – shoe designer
Sir Peter Blake (born 1932) lived in Wellow village, near Bath, in the 1970s.
Peter Brown (born 1967) – painter
James Buckley-Thorp (living) – founder of Bath clothing brand Rupert and Buckley
Claire Calvert (born 1988) – first soloist at the Royal Ballet
Thomas Gainsborough (1727–1788) – painter
Heywood Hardy (1842–1933) – painter
Thomas Lawrence (1769–1830) – painter
Kayleigh Pearson (born 1985) – glamour model

Education
Marie Bethell Beauclerc (1845–1897) – England's first female shorthand teacher
Raymond Carr (1919–2015) – historian
Roderick Kedward (born 1937) – historian
Edward Vansittart Neale (1810–1892) - an English barrister, cooperator, and Christian socialist.
Isaac Pitman (1813–1897) – inventor of shorthand
William Harbutt (1844–1921) – headmaster and inventor of plasticine

Exiles
Haile Selassie I (1892–1975) – during World War II
Louis XVIII (1755–1824) – before ascending the French throne

Film & TV
Bill Bailey (born 1965) – comedian, musician, actor, TV and radio presenter and author
Jesse Honey (born 1977) – BBC Mastermind champion 2010
Russell Howard (born 1980) – comedian, TV presenter and actor
David Lassman (living) – screenwriter
Ken Loach (born 1936) – film director
Charlie McDonnell (born 1990) – Former YouTuber, filmmaker, screenwriter and successful Twitch streamer

Literature

Jane Austen (1775–1817) – novelist: Joan Aiken reports that Austen did not love the city: when she learnt her family were moving to Bath "she fainted dead away."
Thomas Haynes Bayly (1797–1839) - an English poet, songwriter, dramatist and writer.
William Beckford (1760–1844) – wrote Vathek and a series of works on travel.
Henrietta Maria Bowdler (1750–1830) – novelist and editor, died in Bath on 25 February 1830.
Jane Bowdler (1743–1784) – poet and essayist, was born at Ashley, near Bath, on 14 February 1743 and died there in 1784.
John Bowdler (1746–1823) – moral reformer and religious writer, was born in Bath on 18 March 1746.
Thomas Bowdler (1754–1825) – physician and expurgator of Shakespeare, was born at Box, near Bath, on 11 July 1754.
 Angela Carter (1940–1992) - novelist who lived in Bath in the early 1970s. 
Charles Dickens (1812–1870) – novelist and frequent visitor to Bath, who set much of the Pickwick Papers there
Richard Lovell Edgeworth (1744–1817) - an Anglo-Irish politician, writer and inventor.
Henry Fielding (1707–1754) – novelist
William Hone (1780–1842) - an English writer, satirist and bookseller.
Eliza Humphreys (1850–1938) – known as "Rita", wrote A Grey Life, a novel set in Bath. She lived at Combe Down from about 1923 and is buried in Bath Abbey Cemetery.
Morag Joss (born 1955) – novelist
David Lassman (living) – novelist born in Bath, co-author of the Regency Detective series
Robert Montgomery -  an English poet and minister.
Mary Shelley (1797–1851) – novelist, author of Frankenstein.
Richard Brinsley Sheridan (1751–1816) – playwright
Tobias Smollett (1721–1771) – physician, surgeon and novelist, who partly set The Expedition of Humphry Clinker in the city and wrote an essay on the Bath waters.
Geoffrey Trease (1909–1998) – children's novelist, author of the Bannermere series
Horace Twiss KC (1787–1849) - English writer and politician.
Jacqueline Wilson (born 1945) – children's author born in Bath

Military
Horatio Nelson, 1st Viscount Nelson (1758–1805) – admiral, freeman of Bath.
William Edward Parry (1790–1855) – rear-admiral and Arctic explorer. 
Harry Patch (1898–1909) – supercentenarian and last trench veteran of World War I, lived in Combe Down.
George Wade (1673–1748) – field marshal and MP for Bath 1722
James Wolfe (1727–1759) – general

Music

Gabrielle Aplin (born 1992) – singer-songwriter
Danny Byrd (born 1979) – drum and bass producer with Hospital Records
Eddie Cochran (1938–1960) – rock and roll musician who died in Bath
The Family Rain - an English blues rock band, formed in Bath in 2011
Fred V & Grafix – drum and bass production duo educated at Bath Spa University
Peter Gabriel (born 1950) – musician
Interview – New wave band
Alison Goldfrapp (born 1966) – singer of Goldfrapp
Peter Hammill (born 1948) – singer-songwriter
Raymond Leppard (1927–2019) – conductor, educated Beechen Cliff School
Naked Eyes – musical group
Thomas Linley (1733–1795) – musician
Propellerheads - an English electronic music duo, formed in 1995 in Bath
Peter Salisbury (born 1971) – drummer and percussionist of The Verve
Alberto Semprini (1908–1990) – pianist
Innes Sibun (born 1968) – blues singer, guitarist and songwriter
Tears for Fears – musical group
Midge Ure (born 1953)
PinkPantheress (born 2001)

Public service

Ralph Allen (1693–1764) – postal reformer, quarrier and mayor, who set up the first nationwide cross-country postal network
Sir Henry Cole (1808–1882) – civil servant. 
Don Foster (born 1947) – MP for Bath, 1992–2015
Beau Nash (1674–1761) – master of ceremonies in Georgian Bath
John Palmer (1742–1818) – inventor of a lightweight mail coach
Chris Patten – MP for Bath 1979–1992, then Governor of Hong Kong 1992–1997
William Pitt, 1st Earl of Chatham (1708–1788) – Prime Minister and MP for Bath, 1757–1766
William Pitt the Younger (1759–1806) – Prime Minister
Sir William Tite (1798–1873) – architect and MP for Bath, 1855–1873

Science
Benjamin Baker KCB KCMG FRS FRSE (1840–1907) an eminent English civil engineer. 
Adelard of Bath (c. 1080 – c. 1152) – astronomer, philosopher and mathematician
Adela Breton (1849–1923) – artist and archaeologist, primarily known for recording Mexican frescoes in the 1890s.
Mike Cowlishaw (living) – computer scientist and engineer
Richard Lovell Edgeworth (1744–1817) – writer and inventor
David Hartley (the Younger) (1732–1813) – philosopher and inventor
Caroline Herschel (1750–1848) - astronomer who discovered several comets.
William Herschel (1738–1822) – astronomer, discoverer of Uranus and musician
William Lonsdale (1794–1871) - English geologist and palaeontologist.
Thomas Robert Malthus (1866–1934) – philosopher and economist
Dr William Oliver (1695–1764) – a founder of the Royal Mineral Water Hospital and inventor of the Bath Oliver savoury biscuit.
Percy Pilcher (1867–1899) – inventor and aviation pioneer
Richard J. Roberts (born 1943) – Nobel-prize-winning biochemist
Benjamin Robins (1707–1751) - a British scientist, Newtonian mathematician and military engineer.

Sport
Xavier Amaechi (born 2001) – professional footballer.
George Attfield (1826–1925) – county cricketer active in the 1840s and 1850s.
Roger Bannister (1929–2018) – athlete, first man to run sub-four-minute mile
Olly Barkley (born 1981) – England international rugby player
Ashley Barnes (born 1989) – professional football player playing for Burnley F.C.
Tony Book (born 1934) – football player, Manchester City captain and manager, one of a Bath-based Book footballing dynasty
Jamie Chadwick (born 1998) – racing driver
Jason Dodd (born 1970) – footballer, Southampton captain holding a record for most premiership appearances by an English player without being named in an England squad
Jason Gardener (born 1975) – athlete, 4 × 100 m Olympic gold medallist
Matt Green (born 1987) – professional footballer
Mike Gregory (born 1987) – darts player, runner up at 1992 World Professional Darts Championship
Jeremy Guscott (born 1965) – England and Bath rugby player
Ed McKeever (born 1983) – kayak world champion (K1 200m)
Tyrone Mings (born 1993) – professional footballer for Aston Villa F.C.
Siobhan-Marie O'Connor (born 1995) – swimmer, silver medallist at the 2016 Olympic Games 
Andy Robinson (born 1964) – rugby coach, former England international team coach and Bath Rugby team coach
Jack Rowell (born 1964) – Bath Rugby director, former England international team coach and Bath Rugby team coach
Ben Rushgrove (born 1988) – paralympic athlete
Anya Shrubsole (born 1991) – England cricketer
Scott Sinclair (born 1989) – Celtic F.C. player
Talan Skeels-Piggins (born 1970) – Paralympic alpine skier
Amy Williams (born 1982) – winter Olympic gold medallist
Clive Woodward (born 1956) – British Olympic Committee Director of Elite Performance, England international team coach and Bath Rugby team coach

Religion

Louisa Daniell (1809–1871) – evangelical philanthropist and missionary
John Hales (1584–1656) – an English cleric, theologian and writer. 
William Jay (1769–1853) – preacher
Oliver King (c. 1432–1503) – Bishop of Bath and Wells, set up rebuilding of Bath Abbey
Abraham Marchant (1816–1881) – early Mormon leader, settler of Kamas, Utah

Royalty
Queen Anne (1665–1714) – visited for treatment of gout.
Princess Claire of Belgium (born 1974) – born in Bath
Edgar of England (c. 943–975) – crowned king of England in Bath Abbey in 973
Queen Elizabeth I (1533–1603) – on a visit, ordered the restoration of Bath Abbey
Mary of Modena (1658–1718) – came for treatment for infertility. After Prince James Francis Edward Stuart was born, she paid for a cross to be raised in what became Cross Baths.
Queen Victoria (1819–1901) – still a princess, stayed and opened Royal Victoria Park.

Freedom of the City
The following people and military units have received the Freedom of the City of Bath.

Individuals
HRH Duke of Cambridge: 1897 
Rt Hon Lord Strathcona and Mount Royal : 13 July 1911
The Most Honourable Marquess of Bath : 20 June 1929
Emperor of Ethiopia Haile Selassie: 18 October 1954
Amy Williams : 5 June 2010
Mary Berry : 7 June 2014

Military units
21st Signal Regiment (Air Support): November 2011

References

 
Bath
People